Hi Hat Ranch is a planned community located in eastern Sarasota County Florida consisting of approximately .

History
The initial development of Hi Hat Ranch happened when Ross Beason, a New York businessman, acquired the land in 1937. Beason put the land up for sale after World War II. Hi Hat Ranch was then bought by Herman Turner in a series of transactions spanning from 1943 to 1945. Turner assumed full control of the ranch on April 1, 1945, consisting  of land, which is about one-eighth of Sarasota County by total area.

References

Unincorporated communities in Sarasota County, Florida
Unincorporated communities in Florida
Planned communities in Florida